Bulgaria competed at the 1928 Summer Olympics in Amsterdam, Netherlands. Five competitors took part in five events in two sports.

Equestrian

Three equestrians, all men, and four horses represented Bulgaria in 1928 in both individual and team format.

Fencing

Two fencers, both men, represented Bulgaria in 1928. 

 Men

Ranks given are within the pool.

References

External links
Official Olympic Reports

Nations at the 1928 Summer Olympics
1928
1928 in Bulgarian sport